The 2006–07 Copa del Rey was the 105th staging of the Copa del Rey.

The competition started on 30 August 2006 and concluded on 23 June 2007 with the Final, held at the Santiago Bernabéu in Madrid, in which Sevilla lifted the trophy for the first time since 1948 with a 1–0 victory over Getafe.

First round

Second round

Third round

Knockout stages 

 Team listed first were the home team in the first leg

* Match abandoned after 57 minutes at 0–1 due to injury of Sevilla coach Juande Ramos; remainder of the game played on 18 March at the Coliseum, Getafe.

Round of 32 

|}

Round of 16 

|}

Quarter-finals 

|}

Semi-finals

First leg 
All times CEST.

Second leg 

Sevilla beat 5–0 Deportivo on aggregate

Getafe beat 6–5 Barcelona on aggregate

Final

Top goalscorers

TV rights 
 Spain – Telecinco

References

External links 
 Copa del Rey 2006/2007 Official Website

2006-07
1